

0–9
 0D – Zero-dimensional
 1, – Onekama, Michigan (word play based on "one, comma")
 1AM – Air mechanic 1st class
 1D – One-dimensional
 2AM – Air mechanic 2nd class
 2D – (i) Two-dimensional
 2.5D – (p) "Two-and-a-half-dee": two-dimensional computer graphics where some flat images lie in front of others
 2G – (i) Second-generation mobile (cellular, wireless) telephone system
 2.5G – (p) Second-and-a-half-generation mobile telephone system
 2LA – Two letter acronym
 2Lt – 2nd lieutenant
 3AM – Air mechanic 3rd class
 3D – (i) Three-dimensional
 3G – (i) Third-generation mobile telephone system
 3i – (i) Investors In industry (venture capitalists)
 3M – (i) Minnesota Mining and Manufacturing Company
 4D – (i) Four-dimensional (usually three spatial plus one temporal dimension, sometimes four spatial ones)
 4G – (i) Fourth-generation mobile telephone system
 4GL – (i) Fourth-generation programming language
 4WD – (i) Four-wheel drive
 5D – Five-dimensional
 6D – Six-dimensional
 7D – Seven-dimensional
 8D – Eight-dimensional
 9D – Nine-dimensional

See also

 Backronym
 Jargon
 List of reporting marks
 List of government and military acronyms
 List of information technology acronyms
 List of medical abbreviations
 List of abbreviations in photography
 List of abbreviations for market segments
 List of Hebrew acronyms
 List of U.S. government and military acronyms
 List of geographic acronyms and initialisms
 Wikipedia:List of all single-digit-single-letter combinations
 Wikipedia:List of all single-letter-single-digit combinations
 Wikipedia:List of all single-letter-double-digit combinations
 Wikipedia:TLAs

External links
 Abbreviations.com database of acronyms and abbreviations (over 330,000 entries)
 askacronym.com Ask Acronym acronyms and expansions with a description about it
 Acronym Search database of acronyms and abbreviations (over 50,000 entries)
 Acronyms List database of acronyms and abbreviations (over 40,000 entries)
 Acronym Geek database of acronyms and initialisms (over 3,000,000 entries)
 All Acronyms database of acronyms and abbreviations (over 860,000 entries)
 Apronyms & Acronyms a collection of acronyms
 Internet Acronym Server database of acronyms with submission form (over 33,000 entries)
 Smart Define database of acronyms and abbreviations (over 2,000,000 entries)
 Special Dictionary acronyms and abbreviation database
 Laurier Library Canadian Government abbreviations and acronyms]
 Logistics World Transportation Acronyms with some U.S. Government and Military Acronyms

 
ga:Giorrúcháin agus acrainmneacha